Kem Nunn (born 1948) is a third-generation Californian novelist, surfer, and magazine and television writer who lives in southern California. He has been described  as "the inventor of surf-noir" for his novels' dark themes, political overtones, and surf settings. He is the author of six novels, including his 1984 seminal debut surf novel Tapping the Source, which was a finalist for the National Book Award. Tapping The Source inspired the 1991 movie Point Break,  and its 2015 remake. Nunn's novel, Tijuana Straights, received a Los Angeles Times Book Prize.

Nunn collaborated with producer David Milch on the third and final season (2006) of the HBO Western drama series Deadwood. Milch and Nunn co-created the HBO series John from Cincinnati, a surfing series set in Imperial Beach, California, which premiered on June 10, 2007. Nunn also wrote for the last three seasons of the television drama series, Sons of Anarchy.

Nunn was a creator, executive producer, and head writer for the television series, Chance, with Hugh Laurie, directed by Lenny Abrahamson. Chance was based on Nunn's novel by the same name.

Nunn also spent time in the graduate programs in Creative Writing at Columbia and University of California, Irvine.

Biography
Kem Nunn grew up in Pomona and Northern California. He has written the novels Tapping the Source, Dogs of Winter, Pomona Queen, Unassigned Territory, Tijuana Straits, and Chance. He received an MFA in creative writing from UC Irvine.

Nunn joined the crew of the HBO western drama Deadwood as a writer for the third and final season in 2006. The series was created by David Milch and focused on a growing town in the American West. Nunn wrote the episode "Leviathan Smiles". He also wrote for season 5 of Sons of Anarchy.

Bibliography
 Tapping the Source (1984) was a finalist for the National Book Award.
 Unassigned Territory (1986)
 Pomona Queen (1992)
 The Dogs of Winter (1997)
 Tijuana Straits (2004) received the Los Angeles Times book prize.
 Chance (2014), adapted for television as Chance

References

External links
 
 
 
 No Exit Press biography

20th-century American novelists
21st-century American novelists
American male novelists
American television writers
American male television writers
University of California, Irvine alumni
Living people
1948 births
People from Pomona, California
American male screenwriters
20th-century American male writers
21st-century American male writers
Novelists from California
Screenwriters from California
Date of birth missing (living people)